Ratangarh Junction railway station is a railway station in Churu district, Rajasthan. Its code is RTGH. It serves Ratangarh town. The station consists of three platforms. Passenger, Express, and Superfast trains halt here.

Trains

The following trains halt at Ratangarh Junction railway station in both directions:

 Bandra Terminus–Jammu Tawi Vivek Express
 Jodhpur–Delhi Sarai Rohilla Superfast Express
 Salasar Express
 Bhagat Ki Kothi–Kamakhya Express
 Bandra Terminus–Hisar Superfast Express
 Bikaner–Bilaspur Antyodaya Express
 Delhi Sarai Rohilla–Bikaner Superfast Express
 Bikaner–Haridwar Express
 Indore–Bikaner Mahamana Express
 Howrah–Jaisalmer Superfast Express
 Secunderabad–Hisar Express
 Bikaner_Delhi Sarai Rohilla Intercity Express

References

Railway stations in Churu district
Bikaner railway division